This article displays the rosters for the participating teams at the 1980 Tournament of the Americas played in San Juan, Puerto Rico from April 18 to April 25, 1980.

Argentina

4 Jorge Martín
5 Gustavo Aguirre
6 Mauricio Musso
7 Carlos Raffaelli
8 Carlos Romano
9 José Luis Pagella
10 Adolfo Perazzo
11 Miguel Cortijo
12 Eduardo Cadillac
13 Carlos González
14 Gabriel Milovich
15 Luis González
Head coach:  Miguel Ángel Ripullone

Brazil

4 Zé Geraldo
5 Fausto
6 José Carlos
7 Carioquinha
8 Wagner
9 Marquinhos
10 Gilson
11 Marcel
12 Marcelo
13 Luiz Gustavo
14 Oscar
15 Robertão
Head coach:  Cláudio Mortari

Canada

4 Howie Kelsey
5 Martin Riley
6 Doc Ryan
7 Varouj Gurunlian
8 Tom Bishop
9 Jay Triano
10 Leo Rautins
11 Perry Mirkovich
12 Jim Zoet
13 Romel Raffin
14 Ross Quackenbush
15 Reni Dolcetti
Head coach: / Jack Donohue

Cuba

4 Roberto Simón
5 Ruperto Herrera
6 Alejandro Ortiz
7 Noángel Luaces
8 Generoso Márquez
9 Ángel Padrón
10 Pedro Abreu
11 Miguel Calderón Gómez
12 Tomás Herrera
13 Daniel Scott
14 Alejandro Urgellés
15 Félix Morales
Head coach:  Ernesto Díaz

Mexico

4 José Medina
5 Arturo Guerrero
6 Óscar Ruiz
7 Rafael Palomar
8 Antonio Ayala
9 Samuel Campis
10 Guillermo Márquez
11 Martín Ron
12 Hugo Villegas
13 Rubén Alcalá
14 Jesús García
15 Francisco Ríos
Head coach:  Carlos Quintanar

Puerto Rico

4 Georgie Torres
5 Steven Sewell
6 Neftalí Rivera
7 Charlie Bermúdez
8 Rubén Rodríguez
9 Willie Quiñones
10 Angelo Cruz
11 Ángel Santiago
12 Mario Morales
13 Néstor Cora
14 Raymond Dalmau
15 Roberto Valderas
Head coach:  Flor Meléndez

Uruguay

4 Walter Silvera
5 Hugo Bianchi
6 José Barizo
7 Hébert Núñez
8 Jorge Garretano
9 José Guerra
10 Wilfredo Ruiz
11 Walter Pagani
12 Álvaro Belén
13 Germán Haller
14 Daniel Wenzel
15 Víctor Frattini
Head coach:  Ramón Etchamendi

Bibliography

External links
1980 American Olympic Qualifying Tournament for Men at fiba.com

FIBA AmeriCup squads